Mycetina is a genus of handsome fungus beetles in the family Endomychidae. There are about 11 described species in Mycetina.

Species
These 11 species belong to the genus Mycetina:
 Mycetina amabilis
 Mycetina cruciata (Schaller, 1783)
 Mycetina cyanescens Strohecker
 Mycetina fulva Chujo, 1938
 Mycetina hornii Crotch, 1873
 Mycetina humerosignata Nakane, 1968
 Mycetina idahoensis Fall, 1907
 Mycetina pallida Horn, 1870
 Mycetina perpulchra (Newman, 1838)
 Mycetina sasajii Strohecker, 1982
 Mycetina similis (Chujo, 1938)

References

Further reading

External links

 

Endomychidae
Articles created by Qbugbot
Coccinelloidea genera